Neil Rolde (July 25, 1931 – May 15, 2017) was an American historian, author, philanthropist, and politician. Rolde grew up in Brookline, Massachusetts, and attended Phillips Academy in Andover. He earned a BA in English Literature at Yale University and a masters in journalism at Columbia University. He worked as a film scriptwriter before moving to Maine with his wife, Carlotta Florsheim, to raise their family.

Political career 
Rolde's many years of public service include being an assistant to Governor Kenneth M. Curtis of Maine for six years (including campaign manager in 1967) and sixteen years from 1974-1990 as elected representative in the Maine Legislature. He represented the district of York and became majority leader of the Maine House during the 107th Legislature from 1975-77.

In 1976, Rolde ran in a seven-candidate primary for the 1976 Democratic nomination for the United States House of Representatives, where he gained 18 percent of the vote and finished third. In 1990, Rolde won the Democratic Party's nomination but lost to the incumbent Republican Senator Bill Cohen.

Rolde served on a number of state boards and commissions, including the Maine Health Care Reform Commission, the Maine Historic Preservation, and the Maine Arts and Humanities Commission; and private, nonprofit boards, where he served as chairman, Maine Public Broadcasting Corporation, vice-chair, University of New England Board of Trustees, chairman, Board of Bigelow Laboratory for Ocean Sciences, chairman, Seacoast Shipyard Association Executive Board, and trustee, the Maine Health Care Access Foundation.

He was very involved in his York community, remained politically active, and continued to serve as chairman of the board of the Save our Shipyard nonprofit that twice successfully fought the potential cuts to the Portsmouth Naval Shipyard proposed by the BRAC federal commission.

Writing career 
Most of Neil Rolde's books are about Maine history and its people. The history and challenges of Maine's Native Americans has been a reoccurring theme since Rolde's childhood, and he helped the tribes while in the Curtis administration. His experiences led him to write one of Maine's definitive historical books: Unsettled Past, Unsettled Future: The Story of Maine Indians.

The author received awards for his books from the Maine Historical Society, the Maine Writers and Publishers Alliance, and the Maine Humanities Council.

Death
Rolde died of natural causes at his home in York, Maine, on May 15, 2017, at the age of 85.

Publications 
 More Than a Teardrop in the Ocean; Volume 1, The Tempestuous Story of the War Refugee Board
 More Than a Teardrop in the Ocean; Volume 2, More of the Tempestuous Story of the War Refugee Board 
 Real Political Tales: Short Stories by a Veteran Politician
 Breckinridge Long: American Eichmann??? An Enquiry into the Character of the Man Who Denied Visas to the Jews
 York Is Living History
 Maine: A Narrative History, Harpswell Press, 1990
 O. Murray Carr: A Novel
 Maine in the World: Stories of Some of Those From Here Who Went Away
 Continental Liar From the State of Maine: James G. Blaine
 Maine: Downeast and Different, an Illustrated History
 Unsettled Past, Unsettled Future: The Story of Maine Indians
 The Interrupted Forest: A History of Maine’s Wildlands
 The Baxters of Maine: Downeast Visionaries
 Your Money or Your Health: America’s cruel, Bureaucratic, and Horrendously Expensive Health Care System
 So You Think You Know Maine
 Rio Grande Do Norte: The Story of Maine’s Partner State in Brazil
 Sir William Pepperrell of Colonial New England, Harpswell Press, 1982

As coauthor and contributor:
 To Katahdin: The 1876 Adventures of Four Young Men and a Boat
 Greatest Mountain: Katahdin’s Wilderness

References

External links

1931 births
2017 deaths
Historians of Maine
Yale University alumni
Politicians from Brookline, Massachusetts
Maine Democrats
People from York, Maine
American campaign managers
Writers from Maine
Writers from Brookline, Massachusetts
Majority leaders of the Maine House of Representatives